Chtelnica is a village and municipality in Piešťany District in the Trnava Region of western Slovakia.

History
In historical records the village was first mentioned in 1208.  The Hungarian name was Vittenc. The small Jewish community remaining were deported to Nazi death camps Lublin Poland on May 8, 1942

Geography
The municipality lies at an altitude of 204 metres and covers an area of 32.965 km². It has a population of about 2551 people.

Genealogical resources

The records for genealogical research are available at the state archive "Statny Archiv in Bratislava, Slovakia"

 Roman Catholic church records (births/marriages/deaths): 1695-1900 (parish A)

See also
 List of municipalities and towns in Slovakia

References

External links

 https://web.archive.org/web/20071027094149/http://www.statistics.sk/mosmis/eng/run.html
Surnames of living people in Chtelnica

Villages and municipalities in Piešťany District